The fraternal snail (also known as the San Nicolas Island snail, scientific name Micrarionta feralis) is a species of air-breathing land snail. It is a terrestrial pulmonate gastropod mollusk in the family Helminthoglyptidae. This species is endemic to the United States, specifically California.

References

Molluscs of the United States
Micrarionta
Gastropods described in 1901
Taxonomy articles created by Polbot